Nuclear factor 1 X-type is a protein that in humans is encoded by the NFIX gene. NFI-X3, a splice variant of NFIX, regulates Glial fibrillary acidic protein and YKL-40 in astrocytes.

Interactions 
Nfix has been shown to interact with SKI protein and it is also known to interact with AP-1. NFI-X3 has been shown to interact with STAT3.

In embryonic cells, Nfix has been shown to regulate intermediate progenitor cell (IPC) generation by promoting the transcription of the protein inscuteable (INSC). INSC regulates spindle orientation to facilitate the division of radial glia cells into IPC's. Nfix is thought to be necessary for the commitment of glia progeny into the intermediate progenitors. Mutations may cause overproduction of radial glia, impaired and improperly timed IPC development, and underproduction of neurons.  

In adult development, the timing of neural differentiation is regulated by Nfix to promote ongoing growth of the hippocampus and proper memory function.  Nfix may suppress oligodendrocyte expression so cells remain committed to neuron development within the dentate gyrus. Intermediate progenitor cells can divide to produce neuroblasts. Neurons produced by Nfix null IPC's do not mature, usually die, and can contribute to cognitive impairments.

Nfix interacts with myostatin and regulates temporal progression of muscle regeneration through modulation of myostatin expression. Nfix also inhibits the slow-twitch muscle phenotype.

References

Further reading

External links 
 

Transcription factors